The 2018 Chicago Sky season is the franchise's 13th season in the Women's National Basketball Association (WNBA).  The regular season tipped off on May 6, and concludes on August 19.

The Sky started the season off with wins over Indiana and New York and finished 2–2 in May.  However, the team couldn't keep the momentum and lost 7 of their next 8 games.  The Sky ended June on a 3 game win streak with a 4–7 overall record.  The winning streak didn't last long, as the team went 4–8 in July.  All 4 July wins came against eventual playoff teams, but the Sky also had 4 losses against teams that would not end up in the playoffs.  A 3–4 August meant the Sky missed the playoffs for the second straight year.  They were 2 wins behind the 8th seed Dallas Wings.

On August 31, 2018, the Sky relieved Amber Stocks as head coach and general manager.

Transactions

WNBA Draft

The Sky made the following selections in the 2018 WNBA draft:

Trades/Roster Changes

Roster

Game log

Preseason

|- bgcolor="ffcccc"
| 1
| May 63:00 PM 
| Atlanta 
| L 61–78
| Parker (13)
| Parker (8)
| Alston (7)
| Wintrust Arena
| 0–1
|- bgcolor="ffcccc"
| 2
| May 711:30 AM 
| @ Indiana 
| L 65-79
| Cooper/Parker (10)
| Bulgak (8)
| Montgomery/Hopkins/Alston (2)
| Bankers Life Fieldhouse
| 0–2
|- bgcolor="ffcccc"
| 3
| May 12
| @ Minnesota 
| L 58-87
| Dolson (11)
| Dolson/Parker (5)
| Cooper/Quigley (4)
| Target Center5,024
| 0–3
|-

Regular season

|- style="background:#bbffbb"
| 1 
| May 19
| @ Indiana
| W 82–64
| Quigley (19)
| Tied (8)
| Tied (5)
| Bankers Life Fieldhouse6,565
| 1–0
|- style="background:#bbffbb"
| 2 
| May 20 
| New York
| W 80–76
| Quigley (22)
| Parker (8)
| Tied (5)
| Wintrust Arena7,922
| 2–0
|- bgcolor="ffcccc"
| 3 
| May 23
| Atlanta
| L 63–81
| Quigley (13)
| Coates (8)
| 4 Tied (3)
| Wintrust Arena6,147
| 2–1
|- bgcolor="ffcccc"
| 4 
| May 25
| @ Seattle
| L 91–95 OT
| Quigley (23)
| Parker (8)
| Faulkner (9)
| KeyArena5,866
|2–2

|- bgcolor="ffcccc"
| 5 
| June 1
| Connecticut
| L 72–110
| De Shields (15)
| Tied (5)
| Vandersloot (7)
| Wintrust Arena4,131
| 2–3
|- style="background:#bbffbb"
| 6 
| June 3
| Las Vegas
| W 95–90
| De Shields (25)
| Parker (13)
| Vandersloot (9)
| Wintrust Arena5,052
| 3–3
|- bgcolor="ffcccc"
| 7
| June 8
| @ Phoenix
| L 79–96
| Williams (26)
| De Shields (7)
| Vandersloot (6)
| Talking Stick Resort Arena8,834
| 3–4
|- bgcolor="ffcccc"
| 8
| June 10
| @ Los Angeles
| L 59–77
| Parker (17)
| Parker (12)
| Faulkner (6)
| Staples Center8,239
| 3–5
|- bgcolor="ffcccc"
| 9
| June 12
| @ Seattle
| L 85–96
| De Shields (22)
| Parker (10)
| Vandersloot (5)
| KeyArena4,353
| 3–6
|- bgcolor="ffcccc"
| 10
| June 17
| Los Angeles
| L 72–81
| Faulkner (19)
| Parker (10)
| Vandersloot (7)
| Wintrust Arena5,584
| 3–7
|- bgcolor="ffcccc"
| 11
| June 19
| @ Washington
| L 60–88
| Parker (18)
| Parker (9)
| Vandersloot (6)
| Capital One Arena4,206
| 3–8
|- bgcolor="ffcccc"
| 12
| June 22
| Washington
| L 77–93
| Quigley (21)
| Williams (8)
| Vandersloot (7)
| Wintrust Arena5,831
| 3–9
|- style="background:#bbffbb"
| 13
| June 24
| Phoenix
| W 97–88
| Quigley (20)
| Williams (8)
| Vandersloot (12)
| Wintrust Arena4,741
| 4–9
|- style="background:#bbffbb"
| 14
| June 27
| Atlanta
| W 93-80 
| DeShields (23)
| DeShields (11)
| Vandersloot (11)
| Wintrust Arena8,521
| 5-9
|- style="background:#bbffbb"
| 15
| June 29
| @ New York
| W 103–99
| DeShields (22)
| Dolson (6)
| Vandersloot (11)
| Westchester County Center1,837
| 6–9

|- bgcolor="ffcccc"
| 16
| July 1
| New York
| L 94–97 OT
| Quigley (28)
| Dolson (10)
| Faulkner (8)
| Wintrust Arena5,382
| 6–10
|- bgcolor="ffcccc"
| 17
| July 3
| @ Dallas
| L 85–108
| DeShields (20)
| Dolson (5)
| Vandersloot (7)
| College Park Center4,012
| 6–11
|- bgcolor="ffcccc"
| 18
| July 5
| @ Las Vegas
| L 80–84
| Quigley (13)
| Parker (9)
| Vandersloot (9)
| Mandalay Bay Events Center4,699
| 6–12
|- style="background:#bbffbb"
| 19
| July 7
| Minnesota
| W 77–63
| Quigley (15)
| Parker (8)
| Vandersloot (9)
| Wintrust Arena6,139
| 7–12
|- bgcolor="ffcccc"
| 20
| July 10
| Las Vegas
| L 74–98
| DeShields (15)
| Parker (8)
| Vandersloot (8)
| Wintrust Arena7,696
| 7–13
|-  bgcolor="ffcccc"
| 21
| July 13
| @ Washington
| L 72–88
| Quigley (17)
| DeShields (6)
| Vandersloot (9)
| Capital One Arena5,858
| 7–14
|- bgcolor="ffcccc"
| 22
| July 15 
| @ New York
| L 84–107
| Vandersloot (15)
| DeShields (4)
| Vandersloot (8)
| Madison Square Garden2,073
| 7–15
|- bgcolor="ffcccc"
| 23
| July 18
| Seattle
| L 83–101
| Quigley (18)
| Coates (6)
| Tied (6)
| Wintrust Arena10,024
| 7–16
|- style="background:#bbffbb"
| 24
| July 20
| Dallas
| W 114–99
| Cooper (23)
| Vandersloot (10)
| Vandersloot (15)
| Wintrust Arena4,962
| 8–16
|- bgcolor="ffcccc"
| 25
| July 22
| Los Angeles
| L 76-93
| Dolson (20)
| 3 Tied (6)
| Vandersloot (10)
| Wintrust Arena6,477
| 8–17
|- style="background:#bbffbb"
| 26
| July 25
| @ Phoenix
| W 101–87
| DeShields (25)
| Parker (8)
| Vandersloot (11)
| Talking Stick Resort Arena10,338
| 9–17
|- style="background:#bbffbb"
| 27
| July 31
| @ Dallas
| W 92–91
| Quigley (22)
| Tied (6)
| Vandersloot (14)
| College Park Center3,696
| 10–17

|- bgcolor="ffcccc"
| 28
| August 3
| @ Atlanta
| L 74–89
| Vandersloot (24)
| Coates (6)
| Vandersloot (7)
| McCamish Pavilion5,120
| 10–18
|- bgcolor="ffcccc"
| 29
| August 7
| Minnesota
| L 64–85
| Quigley (22)
| Williams (8)
| Vandersloot (7)
| Wintrust Arena6,388
| 10–19
|- style="background:#bbffbb"
| 30
| August 10
| Connecticut
| W 97–86
| Vandersloot (20)
| Coates (10)
| Vandersloot (15)
| Wintrust Arena5,976
| 11–19
|-  bgcolor="ffcccc"
| 31
| August 12
| @ Connecticut
| L 75–82
| Dolson (20)
| Dolson (8)
| Vandersloot (7)
| Mohegan Sun Arena7,687
| 11–20
|- style="background:#bbffbb"
| 32
| August 14
| @ Minnesota
| W 91–88
| DeShields (28)
| Parker (6)
| Vandersloot (10)
| Target Center9,730
| 12–20
|- style="background:#bbffbb"
| 33
| August 18
| @ Indiana
| W 115–106 2OT
| Tied (24)
| Coates (10)
| Vandersloot (10)
| Bankers Life Fieldhouse8,442
| 13–20
|- bgcolor="ffcccc"
| 34
| August 19
| Indiana
| L 92–97
| DeShields (27)
| Dolson (6)
| Vandersloot (7)
| Wintrust Arena7,118
| 13–21

Standings

Statistics

Regular season

Awards and honors

References

Footnotes

Notes

Chicago Sky seasons
Chicago
Chicago Sky season